The Justice of Chester was the chief judicial authority for the county palatine of Chester, from the establishment of the county until the abolition of the Great Sessions in Wales and the palatine judicature in 1830.

Within the County Palatine (which encompassed Cheshire, the City of Chester, and Flintshire), the Justice enjoyed the jurisdiction possessed in England by the Court of Common Pleas and the King's Bench. While the legal reorganisation of Wales and the Marches under Henry VIII diminished the authority of the Earl of Chester (i.e., the Prince of Wales) in the County Palatine, the authority of the Justice was, in fact, increased. In 1542, the Great Sessions were established in Wales, that country being divided into four circuits of three shires each. Denbighshire, Flintshire, and Montgomeryshire were made part of the Chester circuit, over which the Justice presided. Under Elizabeth I, a second justice was added to each of the Welsh circuits, after which the senior and junior justice are generally referred to as the Chief Justice of Chester and the Second or Puisne Justice of Chester.

Because the Cheshire justices were free to practise as barristers in the English courts or sit in Parliament, the post of Chief Justice was often awarded as a form of patronage by the Government to aspiring lawyers. The offices of Chief and Puisne Justice were abolished in 1830, as part of reforms that also brought Wales under the jurisdiction of the courts at Westminster.

Justices of Chester

Philip Orreby 1202–29 
John de Grey c.1246 
William de Vernon 1229–?1236
Richard de Vernon
Earl of Lincoln
John Lestrange 1241-1245
John Grey 1245-1249
Alan la Zouche 1250–1255 
Gilbert Talbot 1255– 
Roger de Montalt/Mohaut (aka Mold) 1258–1259 
Fulk de Orreby 1259–1261 
Thomas de Orreby 1261–1262 
William la Zouche 1262– 
Luke de Thaney  c.1265 
James de Audley c.1265  
Reginald de Grey, 1st Baron Grey de Wilton c.1270
Robert de Ufford c.1276– 
Guncelin Badelesmere 1276-79
Reginald de Grey, 1st Baron Grey de Wilton 1281-1290
Reginald de Grey, 1st Baron Grey de Wilton c.1297
 Richard Massy c.1300 
Robert Holland, 1st Baron Holand c.1307–c.1320
Pain de Tibetot c.1311 
 Richard Daumary c.1325 
William de Clinton, 1st Earl of Huntingdon c.1330 
Hugh de Freyne c.1335 
Henry Ferrers, 2nd Baron Ferrers of Groby 1336–1342 
Thomas de Felton 1369–1381 
Sir John Holland 1381–1385
Edmund of Langley, 1st Duke of York 1385–1387
Robert de Vere, Duke of Ireland 1387–1388
Thomas of Woodstock, 1st Duke of Gloucester 1388–1391
John Holland, 1st Duke of Exeter 1391–1394
Thomas de Mowbray, 1st Duke of Norfolk 1394–1398
William le Scrope, 1st Earl of Wiltshire 1398–1399
Henry Percy 1400–1403
Gilbert Talbot, 5th Baron Talbot 1403–1419
Thomas Beaufort, Duke of Exeter 1420–1427
Humphrey, Duke of Gloucester 1427–1440
William de la Pole, 1st Duke of Suffolk 1440–1450 (jointly from 1443, murdered 1450))
Thomas Stanley, 1st Baron Stanley 1443–1459 (jointly to 1450)
John Talbot, 2nd Earl of Shrewsbury 1459–1460 (KIA 1460)
in commission 1460
John Needham 1461
Thomas Stanley, 1st Earl of Derby 1461–1471
Richard, Duke of Gloucester 1471
Thomas Stanley, 1st Earl of Derby 1471–1504
Sir Thomas Englefield 1505–1514?
Sir Nicholas Hare 1540–1545
Sir Robert Townshend 1545–1557
Sir John Pollard 1557
George Wood Esq.1558 of Hall atte Wood, Balterley, Staffordshire
John Throckmorton 1558–1578
Sir George Bromley 1564–1589
Richard Shuttleworth 1589–1592
Sir Richard Lewknor 1592–1616

Chief and Puisne Justices of Chester

Offices abolished 1830

References

Bibliography

 Chester
Judiciary of England and Wales
Lists of British people